Shirley Ann Russell (11 March 1935 – 4 March 2002) was a British costume designer, who was nominated for Academy Awards for her designs on Agatha (1979) and Reds (1981).

Career 

Russell studied Fashion at Walthamstow College of Art, and she later attended the Royal College of Art. She ran her own firm of film costumiers, called The Last Picture Frock, particularly specialising in 1930s and 1940s clothing. The firm was sold to the costumier Angels in the 1970s. Her interest in historic costume began when she assisted Doris Langley Moore, the founder of the Bath Costume Museum.

Russell's costume designs were detailed and nuanced, using costume to show subtle distinctions in class. She was known for the weight and authenticity her design lent to characters. She designed for stars such as Vanessa Redgrave in A Song at Twilight, Rudolf Nureyev in Valentino and Roger Daltrey in Lisztomania. Her design for Daltrey was described by Russell as "fantasticated gear" - the jacket had huge labels featuring keyboard motifs. Another "fantasticated design" is 'The Acid Queen' from Tommy.

Collaborations with her husband Ken Russell included: Women in Love, Amelia and the Angel, The Music Lovers, The Devils, The Boy Friend, Savage Messiah, Mahler, Tommy, Lisztomania, and Valentino. Russell's other credits include The Little Prince, Lady Chatterley's Lover, The Return of the Soldier, The Razor's Edge, Hope and Glory, The Bride, Yanks, Gulliver's Travels, I Dreamed of Africa, and Shackleton.

Awards and nominations

Awards 
 BAFTA, Best Costume Design – Yanks (1979)

Nominations 
 Academy Award, Best Costume Design – Agatha (1979)
 Academy Award, Best Costume Design – Reds (1981)
 BAFTA, Best Costume Design – Hope and Glory (1987)

Personal life 
Russell was born as Shirley Ann Kingdon in London, England. Whilst studying at Walthamstow College of Art, she met her husband the film director Ken Russell, to whom she was married from 1956 to 1978. They both converted to Roman Catholicism prior to their marriage. They had five children: Xavier, James, Alexander, Victoria and Toby. Following her divorce from Ken Russell, she lived for many years with director Jonathan Benson in Chiswick.

Death
She died from cancer in March 2002, one week before her 67th birthday.

References

External links

A tribute to Shirley Russell

1935 births
2002 deaths
Best Costume Design BAFTA Award winners
Deaths from cancer in England
Converts to Roman Catholicism
English costume designers
Women costume designers
Artists from London